The Florida International University pedestrian bridge collapse occurred on March 15, 2018, when a 175-foot-long (53 m) section of the FIU-Sweetwater UniversityCity Pedestrian Bridge collapsed while under construction. The collapse resulted in six deaths (one worker and five motorists), ten injuries (six serious and four minor), and eight vehicles being crushed underneath. Of the serious injuries, one employee was permanently disabled. At the time of the collapse, six lanes of road beneath the bridge were open to traffic.

The pedestrian bridge was designed to connect the town of Sweetwater to the campus of Florida International University (FIU) in University Park, a suburb west of Miami, Florida, United States. The two were separated by a busy eight-lane highway, which the bridge was designed to span.

The engineering design error that directly led to the collapse was identified by the National Transportation Safety Board (NTSB) as a miscalculation of resistance to sliding of the connection between the walkway surface, and the truss that held it up. The walkway surface was poured concrete, which was allowed to harden before the truss braces were poured above it. These truss members were connected to the deck by steel reinforcing rods embedded in the deck and in the concrete of the truss. In order to hold up the bridge these connections had to prevent the truss from sliding along the walkway surface. The resistance to sliding was miscalculated, and thus was not enough to prevent the connection from sliding causing cracks in the truss concrete. As the cracking enlarged, it ultimately caused the complete disconnection of one of the truss-to-walkway connections, leading to the collapse.

Background 

The FIU Sweetwater UniversityCity pedestrian bridge, located just west of the intersection of Tamiami Trail (Southwest 8th Street) and Southwest 109th Avenue, was planned to connect the FIU campus to student housing neighborhoods in Sweetwater. It was intended to improve pedestrian safety, as the crosswalks at this wide, busy intersection had been identified as a safety hazard, and one student had already been struck and killed by a vehicle. The $14.2 million project was funded with a $19.4 million Transportation Investment Generating Economic Recovery (TIGER) grant from the United States Department of Transportation in 2013, along with state agencies. The bridge cost $9 million to construct, exclusive of the installation cost.

The main companies behind the construction project were Munilla Construction Management (MCM), a Miami-based construction management firm, and FIGG Bridge Engineers, a Tallahassee-based firm. Unlike most bridges in Florida, the design for this project was overseen by the university, not the Florida Department of Transportation (FDOT), in a program known as the Local Agency Program (LAP).

Florida International University is known for its expertise in accelerated bridge construction (ABC) and has attracted international scholars as PhD students. It is home to the federally funded Accelerated Bridge Construction University Transportation Center, which sponsors industry conferences and seminars. The National Transportation Safety Board, however, found that with respect to the bridge, "F.I.U. had no professional engineers on its staff and relied solely on the expertise of its hired contractors."

Bridge layout 
The full  pedestrian bridge was to cross both a major roadway and a parallel water canal with two separate spans connected at a faux cable-stayed tower. The main roadway-crossing span was 175 ft long, and the shorter canal span was to be 99 ft long. An elevator and stairs at the south end added 31 ft, and at the north end, 15 feet, for a total bridge length of 320 feet. At the bridge site, the Tamiami Trail roadway has seven lanes of traffic plus one turn lane.

The school was on spring break at the time of collapse. The canal span, access ramps, and faux cable-stayed tower had not yet been built. Pedestrian use was to begin when the entire project was complete.

Bridge design and construction 

The new pedestrian bridge was designed to connect the campus to student housing in a dramatic, sculptural way and also to showcase the school's leadership in the ABC method of rapid bridge construction. The bridge was meant to last more than 100 years, and to withstand a Category 5 hurricane, according to a statement by the university.

The full bridge project was styled to look like a cable-stayed bridge, with a pylon tower and high cables for dramatic effect, but functionally and structurally it was actually a mono truss bridge, with the spans being fully self-supporting. The bridge spans used a novel concrete truss design invented for this project, a "re-invented I-beam concept." Concrete truss bridges are "exceedingly rare," and "no other designs similar to the FIU bridge" have been discovered. The vertical web of the beam was a series of triangulated concrete diagonal struts along the centerline, and the diagonal angles of the struts varied across the bridge so they would align with pipes from the center pylon, in the eventual faux cable-stayed appearance. The concrete walkway deck was to act as the horizontal bottom flange of a wide I-beam, and the concrete roof canopy was to function as the horizontal top flange of the I-beam. The walkway was thus nearer to ground level than in a standard design where the walkway is placed on top of the structural support system. This reduced the number of steps to climb.

The bridge was a post-tensioned concrete structure. Concrete structures are generally ten times heavier than equivalent steel designs. The bridge was made using a new formulation for concrete, intended to stay cleaner than standard concrete formulations. In the main bridge span, the concrete floor deck, roof, and most diagonal struts contained post-tensioning (PT) members whose compressive effect on the concrete was adjusted after the concrete was cured but prior to loading.

The deck and the canopy had PT cables that were permanently tensioned after the concrete was cured and while the main span was still located in the staging yard. Most of the diagonal truss members, also known as tendons, had two to four PT rods that could be tightened or loosened depending on the engineer's design plan. The high-strength steel rods are sleeved to allow free movement, with only their ends in contact with the concrete to provide a clamping force. This applied tension is necessary to keep concrete members in compression. All of the adjustable tendon rods were oriented with the nut end on top of the canopy, hidden with a "blister" of extra concrete. Adjusting the rods generally required a crane and the specialized crew of a subcontractor.

Two tendons of the main span, particularly the ones nearest the support ends, had PT rods designed for temporarily prestressing the concrete tendons during the movement of the 950-ton span. These four PT rods were tightened explicitly for the day it took to transport the main span over 8th Street and de-stressed (loosened) immediately thereafter. The purpose of the temporary prestressing of the two end tendons was due to the different loads during movement. The transporter's four-point support of the massive span essentially forces the two terminal ends of the bridge span to be cantilevered past the supports, unlike its final placement. The other PT rods, inside the other tendons, were tightened just once and considered permanent. The transport of the prefabricated, 950-ton span (see below) to its location over 8th Street was performed five days before the subsequent collapse.

Construction of the bridge began in March 2016 and was scheduled to be completed in December 2018. The bridge's main span was assembled adjacent to the highway using accelerated bridge construction. It was lifted into place on the morning of March 10, five days before the collapse, during a weekend closure of the roadway.

Collapse

Reports of cracking 
The main span of the bridge was in place by around 11:30 am on March 10. Inspections were performed, and the order was given to release the tension on the steel pretensioned (PT) tendons at the terminal ends of the span. Kevin Hanson, the supervisor of the de-stressing operation of the PT tendons, became aware that cracks formed on the north side of the bridge and was concerned. He sent a text message to his supervisor, Sam Nunez, stating that "it cracked like hell" and included photos of the location near where the detensioned tendons were located. Pedro Cortes and other members of the construction contractor reviewed the cracking and took photos. These cracks were located in the area where the bridge contacts its supporting pier, where the structural diaphragm deck was located. Other cracks were observed in the northernmost diagonal truss member.

Two days before the collapse, on March 13, the engineer of record (EOR) from FIGG became aware of the cracks and began calculating remedial action, including the addition of plastic shims under the diaphragm. He then reported the cracking by voicemail to an FDOT employee. He thought this was not an immediate safety issue, merely something that would need to be repaired later. The FDOT recipient was away for several days and did not hear this message until the day after the collapse. FIGG's engineer of record then decided to re-tension the temporary PT rods in the northernmost tendon to their state on March 10. This plan was developed by FIGG over the 13th and 14th from the FIGG office in Tallahassee, and a meeting was scheduled for March 15 at 9:00 am in a trailer at the construction site.

Now in Miami, two FIGG engineers including the EOR arrived before the meeting to inspect the bridge span along with some of the managers of the consulting engineering firm and the main construction company. They used a lift to get a close view of the damage.

At 9 a.m. on March 15, a university employee heard a loud "whip cracking" sound while under the bridge span, waiting for a red traffic light. At the same time, the design-build team met for about two hours at the construction site to discuss the cracks discovered on March 10. Representatives from both FIU and FDOT were present. The FIGG lead engineer's conclusions were that the structural integrity of the bridge was not compromised and that there were no safety concerns raised by the presence of the crack. FIGG also insisted that no crack repairs should be carried out until the stabilizing of the node and pylon diaphragm with post-tensioning was completed.

An additional measure proposed by FIGG at the meeting to remediate the cracking was telling the contractor that it "must expedite the pouring of the intermediate pylon," a structure that was designed to mimic the tower of a cable-stay bridge. This pylon was to be located on the north end of the main span adjacent to the area that failed and affixed to the same substructure that the failing main span diaphragm sat upon.

The FIGG engineers on site "did not know the reason for the cracks, but still expressed no safety concerns" at the meeting.

Immediately after the meeting between FIGG employees and FIU, FDOT, BPA (Bolton Perez and Associates, Inc., the construction engineering and inspection firm), and MCM (the main construction contractor); the pretensioning crew from Structural Technologies (US licensee of VSL tensioned-concrete technology) began to re-stress the two PT rods in diagonal truss member 11 to 280,000 pounds each. Due to the urgency and short notice demanded by the EOR, the post-tensioning inspection subcontractor, the Corradino Group, was unavailable to monitor this process. FIGG employees, including the EOR, had gone back to Tallahassee. VSL had just completed the procedure, and still had some of their equipment attached and a crane in the air, when the bridge collapsed.

Collapse 
At 1:47 p.m. on March 15, the north end of the installed bridge span had a blow-out as the northernmost tendon (11) sheared the remaining rebar in adjacent vertical truss member (12) at the cold joint (node) where truss members 11 and 12 join the deck. The span sagged deeply as the diagonal fractured, folded, and immediately dropped the heavy full span onto the roadway below. A dashcam video shows that the blowout, collapse, and impact sequence took only a few video frames.

United States Senator and FIU adjunct professor Marco Rubio tweeted that engineers were tightening loosened cables on March 15: "Workers were adding more tension to the steel rod (tendon) inside a concrete diagonal strut at the north end".

Aftermath 
Six people were killed and ten were injured. Five of the victims were killed immediately when the bridge fell; one died at the hospital. Navaro Brown, aged 37, who worked for VSL, the company contracted to apply post-tensioning, died in the collapse. Two other employees of VSL were hospitalized. The other people killed were Alberto Arias, 53, Brandon Brownfield, 39, FIU student Alexa Duran, 18, Rolando Fraga, 60, and Oswaldo Gonzalez, 57.

At the time of the collapse, the roadway was open, and multiple eastbound cars were stopped at a traffic light under the span. Eight cars were crushed. A driver who survived the collapse reported that small rocks fell onto her car just before the front of her car was crushed. A worker saved himself when he heard cracking and locked his safety harness just before the collapse.

Southwest 8th Street between Southwest 107th and 117th Avenues was closed until March 24 while the debris was cleared.

Inquiry 

On March 15, 2018, the NTSB launched a Go-team of 15 people to investigate the bridge collapse. The accident number assigned was HWY18MH009. On March 16, 2018, the NTSB Investigators held their first press conference to discuss the inquiry into the bridge collapse. Noteworthy points from the meeting included a statement that the inquiry was in the very early stages, that cracks in the bridge superstructure did not necessarily make the bridge unsafe, that on-site investigations would take about a week, that preserving perishable evidence was crucial, and that bridge workers were applying a "post-tensioning force" on the bridge before the failure. Also on March 16, 2018, the FDOT released a letter to the public with information about the bridge collapse:

On March 21, 2018, the NTSB sent out a press release detailing the items from the collapse that required further examination at the Turner Fairbank Highway Research Center, in McLean, Virginia. They also confirmed workers were adjusting rod tension when the collapse occurred.

On May 23, 2018, the NTSB released a preliminary report titled "Highway: Collapse of Pedestrian Bridge Under Construction Miami, Florida (HWY18MH009)" which summarized the accident. They said they are evaluating the emergence of cracks in the region of diagonal members 2 (south end of the bridge) and 11 (north end of bridge), and the propagation of cracks in the region of diagonal member 11. Pictures of the cracks from February 24 (before the walkway had been moved into place) were also given. Consulting engineers Bolton-Perez and Associates, had taken several pictures of severe cracks in diagonal member 11 and adjacent to vertical member 12 which had appeared when the bridge was moved into place on March 10.

The Turner-Fairbank Highway Research Center, at the request of the NTSB, tested samples of steel and concrete from the collapsed bridge, and found that the materials met the project requirements. The NTSB similarly asked the FHWA to examine the design of the bridge. The FHWA examination discovered that the bridge designers had overestimated the strength of one section of the bridgeat the point where the diagonal member 11 and vertical member 12 met the bridge deckand underestimated the load that that same section would carry.

In June 2019, OSHA released its final report on the FIU bridge collapse and concluded FIGG Bridge Engineers failed to recognize collapse was imminent when they inspected the bridge hours earlier. They also concluded the bridge had structural design deficiencies, severe cracks were wrongly ignored by the Engineer of Record and warranted street closure, and contract bridge design experts violated basic FDOT construction requirements. The NTSB quickly disapproved of this release by OSHA, citing "a breach of party participation rules" and "contrary to party agreement obligations, OSHA released a report to the public that contained large portions of nonpublic draft NTSB material and failed to provide investigative photographs to the NTSB as required by its status as a party to the investigation."

On October 8, 2019, the NTSB released over 6,000 pages relating to its investigation of the collapse, including letters submitted to the NTSB by the various companies associated with the bridge construction. A final NTSB public hearing on the bridge accident was held October 22, 2019, in Washington, D.C., and concluded "that load and capacity calculation errors made by FIGG Bridge Engineers, Inc., are the probable cause of the fatal, March 15, 2018, Florida International University pedestrian bridge collapse in Miami." The final Highway Accident Report by the NTSB was finalized the same day and released as NTSB/HAR-19/02.

Legal action 
On March 19, 2018, the first civil lawsuit was filed against FIGG Bridge Engineers, MCM, Bolton Perez & Associates, the project's consulting engineer, Louis Berger, and Network Engineering Services for reckless negligence.

On March 21, 2018, U.S. Transportation Secretary Elaine Chao asked the department's inspector general to probe whether the federally funded pedestrian bridge complied with all rules. A subsequent internal memorandum from the Inspector General of the U.S. Department of Transportation, dated March 22, 2018, expressed concerns the project complied with Federal specifications, and that the objective of an audit would be to assess whether the Florida International University pedestrian bridge met Federal and DOT requirements for the TIGER application, approval, and grant agreement processes.

On March 28, 2018, the Miami Herald reported they were denied access to FIU documents related to the bridge construction, citing federal regulations that prevent release of non-public information related to the bridge construction and design project when an NTSB investigation is in progress. A lawyer for Reporters Committee for Freedom of the Press indicated more information should be released under the Florida Sunshine Law, citing intense public interest in the collapse. On May 2, 2018, the Miami Herald filed a lawsuit against FDOT in Florida's Leon County Circuit Court to compel the FDOT to release emails, meeting minutes and other records relating to the bridge's design and construction. On May 3, 2018, a lawyer for the NTSB wrote a letter to Judge Cooper of the 2nd Judicial Circuit of Florida in Tallahassee urging the court to deny a ruling that would favor the Miami Herald plaintiff, for the release of any bridge information generated after a February 19, 2018, cutoff date.

On May 7, 2018, the Miami Herald reported they had received a copy of a memo with photographs from FIU dated February 28, 2018, that had been sent to the Munilla Construction Management company, the bridge project's builder. The memo, which has since been withdrawn from public view, purportedly urged the bridge engineer to respond to their concerns about significant cracks in the concrete joint at connection between the No. 11 truss and the bridge deck.

On August 21, 2018, Leon County Circuit Judge Kevin Carroll ruled the FDOT "shall produce to The Herald the requested records, but that production shall be limited to records from February 20th to March 15th (prior to the collapse)." However, two days later and just as the FDOT was about to release documents, the Florida State ruling was temporarily blocked by U.S. District Court Judge William Stafford on a request from the U.S. Attorney's Office for the Northern District of Florida (on behalf of the NTSB, who is seeking to move the case to a Federal Court). On October 5, Federal Judge Stafford made a final ruling to block the requested documents.

On June 27, 2018, the Travelers Indemnity Company and The Phoenix Insurance Company submitted an 18-page complaint for declaratory relief in U.S. District Court for Florida Southern District, Miami Division. The lawsuit filing seeks to avoid financial liability to the claimants and included the following statement: "There is no coverage under Travelers' and Phoenix's policies issued to Figg for any damages caused by the joint venture and/or partnership between Figg and MCM, as such joint venture and/or partnership was never disclosed to Travelers and Phoenix and does not qualify as an insured under either of the Policies issued to Figg."

The following is from a September 18, 2018 OSHA News ReleaseRegion 4: The U.S. Department of Labor's Occupational Safety and Health Administration (OSHA) on Friday, September 14, cited multiple contractors for safety violations after one employee suffered fatal injuries and five other employees sustained serious injuries when a pedestrian bridge at the Florida International University campus in Miami collapsed. The five companies collectively received seven violations, totaling $86,658 in proposed penalties. OSHA cited Figg Bridge Engineers Inc., a civil and structural engineering company; Network Engineering Services Inc. (doing business as Bolton Perez & Assoc.), a construction engineering and inspection firm; Structural Technologies LLC (doing business as Structural Technologies/VSL), specializing in post-tensioning in bridges and buildings; Munilla Construction Management LLC, a bridge and building construction company; and The Structural Group of South Florida Inc., a contractor specializing in concrete formwork.

A total of 18 civil lawsuits were filed against 25 businesses connected to the failed FIU bridge project. Miami-Dade Circuit Judge Jennifer Bailey is overseeing the on-going case.

On March 1, 2019, Munilla Construction Management, the main Miami-based contractor behind the pedestrian bridge construction, announced a restructuring and recapitalization of the company through a Chapter 11 bankruptcy petition plan of reorganization. The company reached a settlement deal with the victims and their families on May 2, 2019, that would pay up to $42 million.

Replacement bridge 
On May 6, 2020, FDOT announced plans to design and rebuild the bridge, with guidance from the NTSB. The design stage is scheduled to begin in 2021 and last for two years, with a further two years estimated to construct the bridge. Demolition of the remnants of the old bridge began in September 2021, after which the land will be surveyed in preparation for the new bridge.

FDOT announced on May 5, 2022, the new design, a cable-stayed steel box girder bridge built using a conventional six-step construction process with full closure and detour of the roadway beneath. The design of the 280-foot bridge, contracted to Miami-based BCC Engineering, is more than halfway finished as of the announcement, with construction of the bridge itself scheduled to begin sometime in 2024. FDOT now directly manages the project with a budget of $14.6 million, and has relegated Sweetwater and FIU as local partners.

See also 
List of bridge failures
List of structural failures and collapses

Notes

References

External links 
 , NTSB, OMarch 16, 2018
 Computer animation showing the assembly of the FIU pedestrian bridge, MCMMunilla Construction Management
 , Munilla Construction Management, November 18, 2015
 , Florida International University, March 14, 2018
 An initial rendering of the bridge. Actual location is an opposite side of Southwest 109th Avenue, Florida International University
 Accelerated Bridge Construction, University Transportation Center, Florida International University
 , NTSB, October 22, 2019
 , NTSB, October 23, 2019

2018 disasters in the United States
2018 in Florida
Bridge disasters in the United States
Florida International University
March 2018 events in the United States
Transport disasters in 2018
Transportation disasters in Florida
U.S. Route 41
Construction accidents in the United States
21st century in Miami-Dade County, Florida
Disasters in Florida